Bazvand Rural District is a rural district (dehestan) in the Central District of Rumeshkhan County, Lorestan Province, Iran. At the 2006 census, it had 10,931 inhabitants living in 2,317 households.

History
There is a Bronze Age mound in the district, that is registered as a national monument.

Economy
The area is primarily agricultural, with herding and cereal crops. Water is from wells. The villagers also produce handicrafts which bring in additional income.

Villages
The rural district has eight villages:
 Abdal Beygi Mohammadi
 Aqajan
 Bazvandi
 Golestaneh
 Kahriz Gizhian
 Khirdarar
 Rangin Ban
 Rashnudeh

Notes and references 

Rumeshkhan County
Rural Districts of Lorestan Province